Sammy Angott (January 17, 1915 – October 22, 1980) was born Salvatore Engotti in a Pittsburgh area town in Pennsylvania. He was known as a clever boxer who liked to follow up a clean punch by grabbing his opponent, causing him to be known as "The Clutch." In his career, Angott met the best fighters in the welterweight and lightweight divisions. These included Sugar Ray Robinson, Bob Montgomery, Beau Jack, Fritzie Zivic, Henry Armstrong, Redtop Davis, Sonny Boy West, and Ike Williams.  His manager was Charlie Jones.

Angott retired with a record of 94 wins (23 KOs), 29 losses and 8 draws. He was knocked out just once in his career, by Beau Jack in 1946. Statistical boxing website BoxRec lists Angott as the #6 ranked lightweight of all-time.

Early career

Taking the Kentucky Lightweight Championship
Angott defeated Lew Massey at the Columbia Gymnasium in Louisville, Kentucky in a ten-round points decision on December 6, 1937.  Massey took a serious beating and may have been near a knockout in the sixth and ninth, though there were no knockdowns in the bout. The Kentucky boxing commissioner ruled that Massey did not put in enough of an effort in the bout and moved for a temporary suspension. Massey was a solid competitor who had met six world champions before meeting Angott. During his early boxing career, Angott often listed Louisville as his home. Only a month earlier, he had taken the Kentucky State Lightweight Title against Wishy Jones in a ten-round decision.

Angott first defeated Wesley Ramey on May 6, 1938, in a ten-round decision in Louisville, Kentucky. On September 16, 1938, Angott defeated Ramey again in a ten-round unanimous decision at the Sportatorium in Dallas. Ramey held the Michigan State Lightweight Title in 1931.

On May 23, 1938, Angott defeated Frankie Covelli in a ten-round unanimous decision in Chicago. According to the Chicago Tribune, though Angott won the decision, the bout was a tough battle.

On June 1, 1938, Angott defeated Irving Eldridge in a ten-round points decision at Hickey Park in Millvale, Pennsylvania. Eldridge was down for a nine count in the third from a series of rights and was lucky to escape a knockout in the bout.  In the eighth and tenth, Angott caught Eldridge on the ropes and appeared to be close to winning by knockout, but Eldridge soldiered on.

On June 28, 1938, he defeated Tommy Speigal at Hickey Park in Millvale, Pennsylvania in a ten-round unanimous decision. Angott had Speigal floundering in the eighth with a flurry of lefts and rights, though there were no knockdowns in the bout. He had lost decisively to Speigal on November 2, 1936, in ten rounds in Maryland, and again on August 24, 1936, in Millvale, Pennsylvania in a closer eight round split decision. Their August 24 bout was quite close, with Angott taking the aggressive and probably landing more blows, though Speigal may have landed more solid punches.

On July 17, 1939, Angott defeated ethnic Syrian boxer Petey Sarron in a ten-round decision at Forbes Field in Pittsburgh. Sarron had previously held the NBA World Featherweight Title and the loss was one of his last fights. Sarron's strongest rounds were likely the fifth and tenth when he put Angott to the mat for a no-count, but Angott seemed to hold an advantage in points throughout the bout. Angott gained more of his lead on points in the later rounds after the thirty-one year old Sarron had tired. Sarron scored often with his left, but it did not affect the attack of the Angott, who was nine years younger.

He defeated Mexican boxer "Baby" Arizmendi on November 3, 1939, in a ten-round unanimous decision at the Chicago Stadium. Angott was down to his knees for a no count in the second round, but with a barrage of left and rights, he stacked up points in the remaining rounds. In the eighth, he opened a gash in his opponent's eyes, and gained a further advantage.

World Lightweight Title

First taking the NBA World Lightweight Title, May 1940
On May 3, 1940, the lanky fighter gained recognition from the National Boxing Association (NBA) as its world lightweight champion when he outpointed Davey Day over 15 rounds in Louisville, Kentucky. On the eve of the Kentucky Derby before a crowd of 8,000, acting referee Jack Dempsey made the decision giving six rounds to Angott, five to day, and four even. The Associated Press gave Angott nine rounds, with six to Day.

Angott first faced the great Sugar Ray Robinson on July 21, 1941, at Shibe Park in Philadelphia, losing in a ten-round decision. He lost twice more to Robinson on July 31, 1942, in a ten-round decision at Madison Square Garden and on March 4, 1946, in a ten-round decision in Pittsburgh.

Taking the NYSAC World Lightweight Title December 1941
On December 19, 1941, Angott took the New York State Athletic Commission (NYSAC) World Lightweight Title from Lew Jenkins before a crowd of 11,343 at New York's Madison Square Garden. Angott became undisputed champion as he held both the NYSAC and NBA World Lightweight Championship. He dominated the fighting outpointing Jenkins over fifteen rounds.

Single defense of the Lightweight Title against Allie Stolz, May 1942
Angott defended the title only once, a close 15-round points win over Allie Stolz on May 15, 1942, at New York's Madison Square Garden. Stoltz was penalized for low blows in the twelfth and fifteenth rounds, and the substantial crowd of 16,099 was displeased with the final decision for Angott. Stoltz put Angott to the mat in the third round with two fast blows to the chin, but Angott was up and ready by the count of nine. The United Press gave Angott eight rounds, Stoltz five, and two even, though the referee gave nine rounds to Stolz in the close bout. The two judges each gave Angott eight rounds.

On September 28, 1942, Angott defeated Aldo Spoldi, a former European lightweight champion, in a slow non-title ten round bout at City Park Stadium before a crowd of around 5,000 in New Orleans, and according to one source took nearly all of the rounds. The referee threatened to stop the bout in the sixth and seventh for the lack of solid blows thrown. Angott had formerly beaten Spoldi on April 14, 1939, at the Hippodrome in New York before around 2,600 fans in a ten-round points decision. Spoldi was credited with only the fifth, sixth and seventh rounds, while Angott was given the rest.

Vacating the World Lightweight Title due to broken hand, 1942
Weary of the ring and complaining of a broken hand that had failed to heal properly even after surgery, he vacated the World Lightweight Title officially on November 13, 1942. He dug ditches and worked as an athletic instructor at Washington and Jefferson College for the five months he was away from the ring.

Defeating Willie Pep, March 1943
Returning to professional boxing after five months on March 19, 1943, Angott defeated Willie Pep in a non-title bout at New York's Madison Square Garden by a ten-round unanimous decision. He was dominant in the first five rounds and held on to win the decision.  On November 20, 1942, Pep had taken the NYSAC World Featherweight Title. Angott's win after being away from the ring was something of a surprise to the 16,834 fans present at the match. The United Press gave six rounds to Angott, three to Pep, and one even, though the official voting was a bit closer. There were no serious knockdowns, though each boxer had at least one slip to the canvas. Angott showed greater speed and connected with more blows, though the fight in most respects was close, and Pep was favored in the pre-fight betting.

On June 11, 1943, Angott lost to the great Henry Armstrong at Madison Square Garden in a close ten round unanimous decision. The referee voted six rounds for Armstrong and four for Angott, and the judges ruled close to that margin. Angott was nailed with a hard punch to the body in the eighth round that doubled him up, and started a downhill slide, that gave the eighth, ninth, and tenth to his opponent. The savage bout had Armstrong bleeding from the mouth and Angott cut on the left eye and blackened on the left eye.

Retaking the NBA World Lightweight Title, October 1943
Angott took the vacant NBA World Lightweight crown by outpointing Black Baltimore boxer Slugger White in a title bout on October 27, 1943, at Los Angeles' Gilmore Stadium in 15 rounds. At the opening of the fourth round, a generator failure plunged the stadium into darkness, before it could be repaired an hour later. Angott showed dominance in the bout. In the fifteenth, he unleashed a right that briefly sent White out of the ring. Angott lost the title before taking the NYSAC World Lightweight Title, making his title not considered a "unified" World Lightweight Title.

He defeated Bobby Ruffin on December 17, 1943, in a fierce ten round split decision before 11,844 fans at New York's Madison Square Garden. Angott amassed a lead in points in the opening rounds, but Ruffin punched hard enough in the closing rounds to split the decision. The Associated Press gave Angott six rounds to three for Ruffin with one even, though Angott had taken a very brief one count knockdown to the mat in the first round when he was floored with a right from Ruffin after losing his focus dealing a wild punch. Angott used his "windmill" offense dealing flurries of blows at times during the bout.

Final loss of the NBA World Lightweight Title
He lost the NBA title for the last time to Mexican boxer Juan Zurita on March 8, 1944, in a fifteen-round unanimous decision title bout before 11,300 at Gilmore Field in Los Angeles. Zurita led in points by a wide margin by the fight's end. Angott clinched frequently and may have lacked the stamina at 30 required to compete with Zurita who punished him throughout the bout. Zurita dominated after the first round which Angott won with aggressive attacks. Angott may have had difficulty penetrating Zurita's southpaw stance, which gave him trouble landing solid blows throughout the bout. Many of Zurita's more telling blows were lefts delivered with a southpaw stance. Angott claimed he had difficulty making weight and had run five miles and taken steam baths before the weigh-in.

A victory and two close losses against Lightweight Champion Ike Williams, 1944–45

On September 19, 1945, Angott defeated reigning lightweight champion Ike Williams in a sixth round non-title TKO at Forbes Field in Pittsburgh. The win was a bit of an upset as Williams led in the early betting by as much as 3 to 1. Williams was hospitalized that evening from a badly contused or broken rib he received in the first round from a powerful roundhouse right from Angott. The referee stopped the bout in the sixth, after observing Williams was in pain. In two previous meetings between the two on September 6, and June 7, 1944, Williams had won in a somewhat close split decisions at Shibe Park in Philadelphia. In their September 6 bout, Williams clinched the decision with a furious two handed attack in the last two of their ten-round match. Angott appeared strongest in the sixth and seventh rounds with strong blows to Williams' body. In the close bout before 7,568, most of the judges gave Angott the second, seventh, and eighth rounds, though Williams hit more cleanly and was given more rounds by the majority of judges.

TKO loss to former lightweight champion Beau Jack, July 1946
On July 8, 1946, he fell to a seventh-round knockout by Beau Jack at Griffith Stadium in Washington, D.C. The bout was rough and Angott did not answer the bell for the seventh, later complaining of pain from kidney punches in the fifth and sixth rounds, as well as suffering from a badly cramped leg. It was Angott's only known knockout in his career. Jack held the World Lightweight Title for seven months in 1943 and through March in 1944.

On May 16, 1947, Angott defeated Black boxer Johnny Bratton in a ten-round unanimous decision at Chicago Stadium. Before 18,409 fans, Angott took control in the early rounds and gained enough of a margin in points to win the decision. Angott was down for a three count in the tenth round, but Bratton waited until the closing seconds of most rounds to stage an attack. Many in the crowd were not pleased with the verdict, as the fight was close, and believed Bratton deserved at least a draw ruling. The bout was close with one judge and the referee scoring the bout 51 to 49 for Angott. Bratton was considered a serious lightweight contender prior to the match and had won his last ten fights.

Angott defeated Mexican boxer Kid Azteca in his second to last fight on June 26, 1950, at Dudley Field in El Paso in a ten-round unanimous decision. Azteca had formerly held the Mexican Welterweight Title. The crowd of 3,500 was displeased with the frequent clinching in the bout, largely done by Angott.  Handlers had difficulty separating the two boxers after the final bell, and a small riot ensued requiring a police escort to get Angott to his dressing room.

Life after boxing
After retiring from boxing, he was employed by the Shipping Department at Eaton Corporation in Massillon, near Columbus, Ohio, for seventeen years before retiring in 1967 due to poor health.

He died in the Cleveland Clinic in Cleveland, Ohio on October 22, 1980, after a long illness. He left a wife Evelyn, one son, and two daughters.

Achievements and honors
He was inducted into The Ring magazine Hall of Fame in 1973 and the International Boxing Hall of Fame in 1998.

Professional boxing record

See also
Lineal championship
List of lightweight boxing champions

References

External links
 

1915 births
1980 deaths
People from Washington, Pennsylvania
American people of Italian descent
Lightweight boxers
World lightweight boxing champions
Boxers from Pennsylvania
International Boxing Hall of Fame inductees
American male boxers